= Deven Mack =

1. REDIRECT Draft:Deven Mack (2)
